Annulenes are monocyclic hydrocarbons that contain the maximum number of non-cumulated or conjugated double bonds ('mancude'). They have the general formula CnHn (when n is an even number) or CnHn+1 (when n is an odd number). The IUPAC naming conventions are that annulenes with 7 or more carbon atoms are named as [n]annulene, where n is the number of carbon atoms in their ring, though sometimes the smaller annulenes are referred to using the same notation, and benzene is sometimes referred to simply as annulene.

The first three even annulenes are cyclobutadiene, benzene, and cyclooctatetraene ([8]annulene). Some annulenes, namely cyclobutadiene, cyclodecapentaene ([10]annulene), cyclododecahexaene ([12]annulene) and cyclotetradecaheptaene ([14]annulene), are unstable, with cyclobutadiene extremely so.

In the related annulynes, one double bond is replaced by a triple bond.

Aromaticity 

Annulenes may be aromatic (benzene, [6]annulene and [18]annulene), non-aromatic ([8] and [10]annulene), or anti-aromatic (cyclobutadiene, [4]annulene).  Cyclobutadiene is the only annulene with considerable antiaromaticity, since planarity is unavoidable.  With [8]annulene, the molecule takes on a tub shape that allows it to avoid conjugation of double bonds.  [10]Annulene is of the wrong size to achieve a planar structure: in a planar conformation, ring strain due to either steric hindrance of internal hydrogens (when some double bonds are trans) or bond angle distortion (when the double bonds are all cis) is unavoidable.  Thus, it does not exhibit appreciable aromaticity.

When the annulene is large enough, [18]annulene for example, there is enough room internally to accommodate hydrogen atoms without significant distortion of bond angles.  [18]Annulene possesses several properties that qualify it as aromatic. However, none of the larger annulenes are as stable as benzene, as their reactivity more closely resembles a conjugated polyene than an aromatic hydrocarbon.

In general, charged annulene species of the form  [C4n+2+qH4n+2+q]q (n = 0, 1, 2, ..., q = 0, ±1, ±2, 4n + 2 + q ≥ 3) are aromatic, provided a planar conformation can be achieved.  For instance, C5H5–, C3H3+, and C8H82– are all known aromatic species.

Gallery

See also

Annulyne
Circulene
Fulvenes

References

External links
NIST Chemistry WebBook - [18]annulene
Structure of [14] and [18]annulene

 
Physical organic chemistry